The 2010 South American Basketball Championship was the 44th edition of the South American Basketball Championship. Eight teams featured the competition, held in Neiva, Colombia from 26 to July 31 in the Coliseo Álvaro Sánchez Silva. Argentina was the defending champion, but lost in the final to Brazil. The first three places qualified for the basketball tournament at the 2011 Pan American Games and to the 2011 FIBA Americas Championship, the latter of which doubled as the FIBA Americas qualifier for the 2012 Olympics. Because Argentina, which automatically qualified for the FIBA Americas Championship as host, finished in an automatic qualifying spot, the fourth-place team was also invited to that competition. The fifth-place team did not initially qualify for that competition, but was later invited once the United States withdrew from that event because it had qualified for the Olympics by winning the 2010 FIBA World Championship.

Preliminary round

Group A

Group B

Knockout round

Championship

Semifinals

Bronze medal game

Final

5th–8th playoffs

5th–8th semifinals

7th place playoff

5th place playoff

Final standings

References

External links
Official website

South American Basketball Championship
2010–11 in South American basketball
Basketball
International basketball competitions hosted by Colombia
Qualification tournaments for the 2011 Pan American Games